Ungusurculus is a genus of viviparous brotulas found in the western Pacific Ocean.

Species
There are currently six recognized species in this genus:
 Ungusurculus collettei Schwarzhans & Møller, 2007
 Ungusurculus komodoensis Schwarzhans & Møller, 2007
 Ungusurculus philippinensis Schwarzhans & Møller, 2007
 Ungusurculus riauensis Schwarzhans & Møller, 2007
 Ungusurculus sundaensis Schwarzhans & Møller, 2007
 Ungusurculus williamsi Schwarzhans & Møller, 2007

References

Bythitidae